Garelli Motorcycles was an Italian moped and motorcycle manufacturer. It was founded in 1919 by Adalberto Garelli (10 July 1886 – 13 January 1968).

History
At age 22, Adalberto Garelli received a degree in engineering and dedicated his work to developing and perfecting the two-stroke engine for Fiat. Garelli quit in 1911 due to Fiat's lack of enthusiasm for the two-stroke engine. He continued his own engine design between 1911 and 1914 which resulted in the 350 cc split-single cylinder engine. Garelli worked for other motorcycle manufacturers from 1914 to 1918 during which time he won a competition organized by the Royal Italian Army to design a motorcycle with which he used his 350 cc split-single engine.

In 1919, Garelli constructed a 350 cc motorcycle which set a long-distance record from Milan to Naples. Many famous Italian racers such as Ernesto Gnesa, Tazio Nuvolari and Achille Varzi began their racing careers on Garelli bikes. The Garelli 350 cc split-single stayed in production until 1926 and made a major impact in racing. The company also produced motorcycles for the Royal Italian Army. After World War II, Garelli concentrated on producing smaller bikes and mopeds for the European market.

In the 1970's Garelli produced the Tiger Cross MK 1 which was an off road 2 stroke enduro motorcycle. The Tiger Cross was produced in 1976. The motorcycle was painted black and yellow.

In 2019, in the centenary year of the foundation, the brand returned into the market with fully electric products: Ciclone Sic58 and E-Bike Ciclone Sic58.
In collaboration with the Marco Simoncelli Foundation.

Racing and endurance history

Garelli set eight world long distance records on November 3, 1963 with 2 50 cm3 motorcycles.

In the early 1980s, Garelli dominated the 125 class in Grand Prix motorcycle racing winning six consecutive world championships between 1982 and 1987.

MotoGP World Championship

Garelli won the following World Titles in the 125 cc class:

MotoGP World Constructors champions
 50 cc class
 1983
 125 cc class
 1982, 1983, 1984, 1985, 1986, 1987

See also

 List of Italian companies
 List of motorcycle manufacturers
 List of scooter manufacturers
 Types of motorcycles

References

External links 
 

Motorcycle manufacturers of Italy
Moped manufacturers
Scooter manufacturers
Electric motorcycles
Cycle manufacturers of Italy
Mountain bike manufacturers
Electric bicycles
Italian brands
Vehicle manufacturing companies established in 1919
Italian companies established in 1919
Motorcycles by brand